McCarrahan Lake is a lake in Todd County, in the U.S. state of Minnesota.

McCarrahan Lake was named after William McCarrahan, an early settler.

See also
List of lakes in Minnesota

References

Lakes of Minnesota
Lakes of Todd County, Minnesota